Piotr Greger (born 24 March 1964) is a Polish Roman Catholic bishop.

Ordained to the priesthood on 13 May 1989. Greger was named auxiliary bishop of the Roman Catholic Diocese of Bielsko–Żywiec, Poland on 22 October 2011.

References 

1964 births
Living people
People from Tychy
21st-century Roman Catholic bishops in Poland